PPRC may refer to:

Peer to Peer Remote Copy
Pharmacopoeia of the People's Republic of China
Port Pirie Regional Council, South Australia
Power and Participation Research Centre, an independent non-profit organization based in Dhaka, Bangladesh
Paddy Processing Research Centre, a former name of the Indian Institute of Food Processing Technology